.java may refer to:
 a file extension of software source files in the Java programming language, see Java (programming language)
 an internet top level domain, see List of Internet top-level domains